The 1954 Norwegian Football Cup was the 49th season of the Norwegian annual knockout football tournament. The tournament was open for all members of NFF, except those from Northern Norway. The final was played at Ullevaal Stadion in Oslo on 24 October 1954, and was contested by six-time winners Fredrikstad, and Skeid, who had won the cup once (1947). Skeid secured their second title with a 3-0 win in the final. Viking was the defending champions, but was eliminated by Larvik Turn in the quarterfinal.

First round

|-
|colspan="3" style="background-color:#97DEFF"|Replay

|}

Second round

|-
|colspan="3" style="background-color:#97DEFF"|Replay

|}

Third round

|colspan="3" style="background-color:#97DEFF"|8 August 1954

|-
|colspan="3" style="background-color:#97DEFF"|9 August 1954

|}

Fourth round

|colspan="3" style="background-color:#97DEFF"|5 September 1954

|-
|colspan="3" style="background-color:#97DEFF"|Replay: 19 September 1954

|}

Quarter-finals

|colspan="3" style="background-color:#97DEFF"|26 September 1954

|}

Semi-finals

|colspan="3" style="background-color:#97DEFF"|10 October 1954

|-
|colspan="3" style="background-color:#97DEFF"|Replay: 17 October 1954

|}

Final

See also
1953–54 Norwegian Main League
1954 in Norwegian football

References

Norwegian Football Cup seasons
Norway
Cup